Ginkgo huolinhensis is an extinct  species of seed plant in the family Ginkgoaceae.

References

huolinhensis
Early Cretaceous plants
Plants described in 2012
Fossil taxa described in 2012